Thaddeus Coleman (born June 20, 1985) is an American professional Canadian football offensive lineman who is currently a free agent. He most recently played for the Toronto Argonauts of the Canadian Football League (CFL). He was signed by the Arizona Cardinals as an undrafted free agent in 2008. He played college football at Mississippi Valley State. Coleman has also been a member of the New York Jets, Edmonton Eskimos, RiverCity Rage, Winnipeg Blue Bombers, Chicago Rush, Virginia Destroyers, Orlando Predators, New Orleans VooDoo, San Jose SaberCats, and Saskatchewan Roughriders.

Early years
He played American football at North Chicago Community High School in Illinois.

Professional career

Arizona Cardinals
Coleman signed with the Arizona Cardinals following the NFL draft.

New Orleans VooDoo
After two and a half seasons with the Orlando Predators, Coleman was traded on April 18, 2013 to the New Orleans VooDoo for defensive end Prentice Purnell.

San Jose SaberCats
On October 16, 2015, Coleman was assigned to the San Jose SaberCats.

Edmonton Elks
Coleman signed with the Edmonton Elks on July 11, 2021, and was placed on the team's suspended list for COVID-19 protocols. He did not play in a regular season game for the Elks and was released on July 29, 2021.

Toronto Argonauts
On November 9, 2021, it was announced that Coleman had signed with the Toronto Argonauts. He played in the last regular season game for the Argonauts in 2021 and his practice roster contract expired on December 6, 2021.

Personal
Coleman is the son of former NFL linebacker Michael Coleman who played for the Washington Redskins and New Orleans Saints.

References

External links
Toronto Argonauts bio

1985 births
Living people
American football offensive tackles
American players of Canadian football
Sportspeople from Waukegan, Illinois
Canadian football offensive linemen
Mississippi Valley State Delta Devils football players
Arizona Cardinals players
New York Jets players
Edmonton Elks players
RiverCity Rage players
Winnipeg Blue Bombers players
Saskatchewan Roughriders players
Chicago Rush players
Virginia Destroyers players
Orlando Predators players
New Orleans VooDoo players
San Jose SaberCats players
Toronto Argonauts players